Zorochros titanus, is a species of click beetle found in Sri Lanka.

Description
Body distinctly convex. Body length is approximately about 4 mm. Lateral carina of pronotum incomplete, reaching 2/3 of pronotum at best. Elytra unicoloured, and shiny. Antennae not reaching apices of pronotum by the length of last 2 antennomeres. Base of pronotum is without median carina. There is a medially prominent, distinctly granulated anterior part. Scutellum is distinctly cordiform.

References 

Elateridae
Insects of Sri Lanka
Insects described in 1998